The Jacob Spori Building was a historic building located in Rexburg, Idaho listed on the National Register of Historic Places.  It was the first building built at the permanent location of Ricks College, a college founded in 1888 by the Church of Jesus Christ of Latter-day Saints.

It was built during 1900 to 1903. Lighter colored sandstone was used for string courses encircling the building.

The building was destroyed by a fire in 2000. A new Spori Building was built on the same site and in a similar style.

See also
 List of National Historic Landmarks in Idaho
 National Register of Historic Places listings in Madison County, Idaho

References

Buildings and structures in Madison County, Idaho
National Register of Historic Places in Madison County, Idaho
School buildings on the National Register of Historic Places in Idaho